The Misogynists is a 2017 comedy film written and directed by Onur Tukel and starring Dylan Baker, Lou Jay Taylor, Trieste Kelly Dunn, and Ivana Miličević.  The film is set on the night of the 2016 United States presidential election.

Cast
Dylan Baker as Cameron
Lou Jay Taylor as Baxter
Trieste Kelly Dunn as Amber
Ivana Miličević as Sasha
Nana Mensah as Blake

Release
The Misogynists had its world premiere at the Hamptons International Film Festival on October 6, 2017.  The film later played at the Indie Memphis Film Festival, the Denver International Film Festival, and the Cucalorus Film Festival.

References

External links
 

2017 films
American comedy films
2017 comedy films
Films directed by Onur Tukel
Films shot in New York City
2010s English-language films
2010s American films